Mustafa Abdul-Hamid (born June 2, 1988) is an American former professional basketball player.

Abdul-Hamid played for the UCLA Bruins from 2006–2010.

Professional career
In August 2010, Abdul-Hamid signed a one-year contract with Hemofarm from Serbia. However, in March 2011, he moved to France and signed with Lille for the rest of the 2010–11 season.

In December 2011, Abdul-Hamid signed with the Slovenian team Krka, but was released later that month. However, in February 2012, after the unexpected departure of Ben Hansbrough, Krka re-signed him until the end of the 2011–12 season.

In September 2012, Abdul-Hamid signed a two-month contract with Oldenburg of Germany, as a replacement for injured Chris Kramer. In February 2013, he was re-signed by the German team for the remainder of the 2012–13 season.

In January 2014, Abdul-Hamid signed with Hoops Club in Lebanon. In March 2014, he returned to Germany and signed with Artland Dragons for the rest of the season.

References

External links
 Mustafa Abdul-Hamid at eurobasket.com
 Mustafa Abdul-Hamid at fiba.com
 Mustafa Abdul-Hamid at uclabruins.com
 Mustafa Abdul-Hamid at AngelList

1988 births
Living people
American expatriate basketball people in France
American expatriate basketball people in Germany
American expatriate basketball people in Lebanon
American expatriate basketball people in Serbia
American expatriate basketball people in Slovenia
Artland Dragons players
Basketball League of Serbia players
Basketball players from St. Louis
EWE Baskets Oldenburg players
KK Hemofarm players
KK Krka players
Point guards
UCLA Bruins men's basketball players
American men's basketball players